Salband (also Romanized as Sālband; also known as Qeshlāq-e Dūmān) is a village in Chaybasar-e Shomali Rural District, Bazargan District, Maku County, West Azerbaijan Province, Iran. At the 2006 census, its population was 142, in 25 families.

References 

Populated places in Maku County